Oktyabrsky is a rural locality (a settlement) and the administrative center of Oktyabrskoye Rural Settlement, Paninsky District, Voronezh Oblast, Russia. The population was 806 as of 2010. There are 11 streets.

Geography 
Oktyabrsky is located on the right bank of the Ikorets River, 28 km southwest of Panino (the district's administrative centre) by road. Toydensky is the nearest rural locality.

References 

Rural localities in Paninsky District